Sir William Tite  (7 February 179820 April 1873) was an English architect who twice served as President of the Royal Institute of British Architects. He was particularly associated with various London buildings, with railway stations and cemetery projects. He was the Member of Parliament (MP) for Bath from 1855 until his death.

Early life and career
Tite was born in the parish of St Bartholomew the Great in the City of London,  in February 1798, the son of a merchant in Russian goods named Arthur Tite.

He was articled to David Laing, architect of the new Custom House, and surveyor to the Parish of St Dunstan-in-the-East. Tite assisted Laing in the rebuilding of St Dunstan's church: according to an article published in the Architect in 1869, Tite entirely designed the new building, Laing himself having no knowledge of Gothic architecture.

In 1827–8 Tite built the Scottish church in Regent Square, St Pancras, London, for Edward Irving, in a Gothic Revival style, partly inspired by York Minster, and ten years later collaborated with Charles Robert Cockerell in designing the London & Westminster Bank head office in Lothbury, also in the city.

Royal Exchange

The rebuilding of the Royal Exchange, opened in 1844, was Tite's greatest undertaking. The previous building was destroyed by fire in 1838, and a competition to design a replacement was held the following year. When this proved unproductive, a second limited competition was held between Tite, Charles Robert Cockerell, George Gwilt, Charles Barry and Robert Smirke. Tite's winning design has an imposing eight-column entrance portico, inspired by the Pantheon in Rome, while the other sides of the building are based on Italian renaissance models.

Railway stations
Tite was the architect for the Eastern Counties, London and Blackwall, Gravesend and South Western Railways, and in France those between Paris and Rouen and Rouen and Le Havre; an article in the Architect named the station at Rouen, spanning nearly ninety feet, as an example of his structural skill. Tite designed many of the early railway stations in Britain, including:
The termini of the London and South Western Railway at Vauxhall (Nine Elms), Southampton Terminus, Gosport and Windsor Riverside
The termini of the London and Blackwall Railway at Minories and Blackwall (1840)
Carnforth, Carlisle Citadel and Lancaster Castle railway stations (1846–1847)
The majority of the stations on the Caledonian and Scottish Central railways, including Edinburgh (1847–1848) (not built) and Perth (1847–1848)
Barnes, Barnes Bridge, Chiswick and Kew Bridge railway stations (1849)
Stations between Yeovil and Exeter, including Axminster and the now-demolished Honiton.

His station at Carlisle was built in a neo-Tudor style with a frontage of about 400 feet, broken into several masses. At the centre of the façade was an arcade of five arches, with buttresses and pinnacles. The refreshment rooms had "an open timber roof, and oriels or bays, reminiscent of the dining-hall of olden times".

Cemeteries

As a company director of the South Metropolitan Cemetery Company he laid out his first cemetery at Norwood in 1836 and designed several significant monuments and chapels there. While previous cemetery designs had followed a classical style, Tite's design was the first to employ the Gothic revival alongside landscaping, which was subsequently judged to be the archetype for future cemeteries.

Between 1853 and 1854, with Sydney Smirke, he landscaped Brookwood Cemetery near Woking in Surrey for the London Necropolis Company. 
Maintaining his associations with railways, this cemetery was served by a dedicated train service from London Necropolis railway station, next to Waterloo station, in central London.

Between 1858 and 1859 he built a memorial church in the Byzantine style at Gerrards Cross, Buckinghamshire.

Later life
Tite's active work as an architect ceased about twenty years before his death (in recognition of his contributions, however, he was awarded the RIBA Royal Gold Medal in 1856).

In 1851 he visited Italy after a grave illness. In 1854 he stood for parliament, unsuccessfully contesting Barnstaple as a Liberal, but the following year he was returned as Member of Parliament for Bath, which he represented until his death. He keenly opposed Sir George Gilbert Scott's proposal to build the new Foreign and Commonwealth Office and other government buildings adjacent to the Treasury in Whitehall in the Gothic style. He was knighted in 1869, and was made a Companion of the Bath the next year. Tite had a wide knowledge of English literature and was a good linguist and a lover of old books.  He was an elected a fellow of the Royal Society in 1835, and a fellow of the Society of Antiquaries of London in 1839. He was President of the Camden Society and of the Royal Institute of British Architects.

He was a director of the London and Westminster Bank and Governor of the Bank of Egypt; in 1856 he was nominated a member of the Select Committee on the Bank Charter. He was a member of the Metropolitan Board of Works, a magistrate of Middlesex and Somerset and Deputy Lieutenant for London.  He was also a Governor of St. Thomas's Hospital, London, where he is commemorated by the William Tite Scholarship, for the best student in the first year, with the highest aggregate marks in Anatomy and Physiology. After over 125 years, this prize has been subsumed into King's College London, where it is still awarded for excellence in the pre-clinical medical course.

He died on 20 April 1873 at Torquay and was interred in the catacombs of his South Metropolitan Cemetery. Tite Street, which runs north-west from London's Chelsea Embankment, is named after him. Tite was a member of the Metropolitan Board of Works, largely responsible for the construction of Chelsea Embankment.

Gallery of architectural work

Notes

References
 S. P. Parissien Tite, Sir William (1798–1873) Oxford Dictionary of National Biography (subscription needed)
Attribution:

External links 
 

 41 Lothbury, London & Westminster Bank building, now refurbished as serviced offices
 Friend of West Norwood Cemetery
 

1798 births
1873 deaths
Liberal Party (UK) MPs for English constituencies
Fellows of the Royal Society
19th-century English architects
Gothic Revival architects
English landscape architects
Knights Bachelor
Companions of the Order of the Bath
Burials at West Norwood Cemetery
UK MPs 1852–1857
UK MPs 1857–1859
UK MPs 1859–1865
UK MPs 1865–1868
UK MPs 1868–1874
Recipients of the Royal Gold Medal
Presidents of the Royal Institute of British Architects
People from the City of London
Members of the Metropolitan Board of Works
British railway architects
Architects from London